San Giuseppe is the Italian name of Saint Joseph. It may refer to:

Places of Italy

Municipalities
San Giuseppe Jato, in the Province of Palermo, Sicily
San Giuseppe Vesuviano, in the Province of Naples, Campania
Rima San Giuseppe, in the Province of Vercelli, Piedmont
San Marzano di San Giuseppe, in the Province of Taranto, Apulia

Hamlets 
 San Giuseppe (Cassola), in the municipality of Cassola (VI), Veneto
 San Giuseppe (Comacchio), in the municipality of Comacchio (FE), Emilia-Romagna
 San Giuseppe, Cuneo, in the municipality of Cuneo (CN), Piedmont
 San Giuseppe (Montecarlo), in the municipality of Montecarlo (LU), Tuscany
 San Giuseppe (Tolentino), in the municipality of Tolentino (MC), Marche
 San Giuseppe di Casto, in the municipality of Andorno Micca (BI), Piedmont

Quarters
San Giuseppe (Monza), in the city of Monza, Lombardy
San Giuseppe (Naples), in the city of Naples, Campania

Churches

Italy
San Giuseppe (Florence), a Roman Catholic church in Florence, Tuscany
San Giuseppe (Milan), a Roman Catholic church in Milan, Lombardy
San Giuseppe (Parma), a Roman Catholic church in Parma, Emilia-Romagna
San Giuseppe (Siena), a Roman Catholic church in Siena, Tuscany
San Giuseppe dei Falegnami, a Roman Catholic church in Rome, Lazio
San Giuseppe dei Teatini, Palermo, a Roman Catholic church in central Palermo, Sicily

United States
San Giuseppe's Church (New York City), a Roman Catholic parish church in New York City

Other
San Giuseppe nero, Italian wine grape grown in the Lazio region

See also

Saint Joseph (disambiguation)
San José (disambiguation)
São José (disambiguation)